Ventilago is a genus of plants in the family Rhamnaceae.  It includes about 40 species found in the tropics of South and SE Asia, Australasia, with one species each in Africa and Madagascar.

The roots of Ventilago neocaledonica are used in Vanuatu to produce a crimson red dye (known in some local languages as labwa or labwe which is used to pattern traditional textiles.

Species
Plants of the World Online currently includes:

 Ventilago africana Exell
 Ventilago borneensis Ridl.
 Ventilago brunnea Merr.
 Ventilago buxoides Baill.
 Ventilago calyculata Tul.
 Ventilago crenata Cahen & Utteridge
 Ventilago cristata Pierre
 Ventilago denticulata Willd.
 Ventilago dichotoma (Blanco) Merr.
 Ventilago diffusa (G.Don) Exell
 Ventilago ecorollata (F.Muell.) F.Muell.
 Ventilago elegans Hemsl.
 Ventilago ferruginea Cahen & Utteridge
 Ventilago flavovirens Cahen & Utteridge
 Ventilago gamblei Suess.
 Ventilago gladiata Pierre
 Ventilago goughii Gamble
 Ventilago harmandiana Pierre
 Ventilago inaequilateralis Merr. & Chun
 Ventilago kurzii Ridl.
 Ventilago lanceolata Merr.
 Ventilago laotica (Tardieu) J.F.Maxwell
 Ventilago leiocarpa Benth.
 Ventilago leptadenia Tul.
 Ventilago lucens Miq.
 Ventilago madraspatana Gaertn.
 Ventilago maingayi M.A.Lawson
 Ventilago malaccensis Ridl.
 Ventilago microcarpa K.Schum.
 Ventilago multinervia Merr.
 Ventilago neocaledonica Schltr.
 Ventilago nisidai Kaneh.
 Ventilago palawanensis Elmer
 Ventilago papuana Merr. & L.M.Perry
 Ventilago pauciflora Pit.
 Ventilago pseudocalyculata Guillaumin
 Ventilago pubiflora W.D.Francis 
 Ventilago viminalis Hook. 
 Ventilago vitiensis A.Gray
 Ventilago zhengdei G.S.Fan

References

Rhamnaceae
Rhamnaceae genera